The men's football tournament at the 2006 Asian Games was held from 18 November to 15 December 2006 in Al-Wakrah, Al-Rayyan and Doha, Qatar.

Squads

Results
All times are Arabia Standard Time (UTC+03:00)

Round 1

Group A

Group B

Round 2

Group A

Group B

Group C

Group D

Group E

Group F

Second-placed teams

Knockout round

Quarterfinals

Semifinals

Bronze medal match

Gold medal match

Goalscorers

Final standing

References

RSSSF

External links
 Official men football schedule 
 Official women football schedule

Men